Proteuxoa argonephra is a moth of the family Noctuidae. It is found in Western Australia.

External links
Australian Faunal Directory

Proteuxoa
Moths of Australia
Moths described in 1931